The Woodruff-Fontaine House is a historic building at 680 Adams Avenue in Memphis, Tennessee, United States.

It was constructed in 1871 on Adams Avenue, which was once known as "Millionaire's Row" in Memphis.  It was designed by the Jones and Baldwin firm of Edward C. Jones and Matthias H. Baldwin. Impressed by its construction, the neighbors had their home, the Goyer Lee House, expanded by the same firm.

After standing empty for many years, in 1962 the house was acquired and restored by the Association for the Preservation of Tennessee Antiquities. In 1971 the Woodruff-Fontaine House and the adjacent James Lee House were listed together on the National Register of Historic Places under the title "Lee and Fontaine Houses of the James Lee Memorial". The two houses also are included in the Victorian Village historic district. The Woodruff-Fontaine House is operated for tours, luncheons, weddings, and as a gift shop.

References

External links
Woodruff-Fontaine House website

Historic house museums in Tennessee
Houses completed in 1871
Houses in Memphis, Tennessee
Museums in Memphis, Tennessee
Historic district contributing properties in Tennessee
National Register of Historic Places in Memphis, Tennessee
Houses on the National Register of Historic Places in Tennessee
1871 establishments in Tennessee